Golden Buddha may refer to:
 Golden Buddha (statue), a solid-gold statue of Buddha in Bangkok, Thailand
 Golden Buddha (novel), a 2003 novel by Clive Cussler
 The Golden Buddha, a 1966 Shaw Brothers film